The following lists events that happened in 1914 in El Salvador.

Incumbents
President: Carlos Meléndez Ramírez (until 29 August), Alfonso Quiñónez Molina (starting 29 August)
Vice President: Vacant

Events

August
 29 August – Carlos Meléndez Ramírez resigned as Provisional President and Alfonso Quiñónez Molina succeeded him as Provisional President.

Undated
 Chinameca S.C., a Salvadoran football club, was established.

References

 
El Salvador
1910s in El Salvador
Years of the 20th century in El Salvador
El Salvador